A by-election was held in the New South Wales Legislative Assembly seat of Willoughby on 12 February 2022, caused by  the resignation of Premier of New South Wales and Liberal MP Gladys Berejiklian.

The Willoughby by-election was held on the same day as by-elections for the districts of Bega, Monaro and Strathfield. The writs for election were issued on 21 January 2022. Nominations for candidates closed seven days later at noon on 27 January, with the ballot paper draw commencing in the morning of 28 January.

The NSW Electoral Commission pre-emptively sent postal ballots to all voters registered on the state electoral roll for the relevant districts, under a regulation in a COVID amendment to the Electoral Act. Postal votes will be checked against in-person voting rolls to prevent double voting. The iVote online voting system was not used at these elections after the system failed during the NSW local government elections in December 2021.

Candidates

Results

The two-candidate swing from the 2019 general election is calculated from the NSW Electoral Commission Two Candidate Preferred (TCP) Analytical Tool for Berejiklian (LIB) vs Penn (IND).

See also
Electoral results for the district of Willoughby
List of New South Wales state by-elections

References

External links
New South Wales Electoral Commission: Willoughby State by-election

2022 elections in Australia
New South Wales state by-elections